Anastasia Flussmann was a female Austrian international table tennis player.

She won a bronze at the 1926 World Table Tennis Championships in the women's singles.

See also
 List of table tennis players
 List of World Table Tennis Championships medalists

References

Austrian female table tennis players
World Table Tennis Championships medalists